Tolu Olukayode Odugbemi  (born 30 January 1945) is a Nigerian professor of  Medical Microbiology, educational administrator and former  vice chancellor of the University of Lagos, Nigeria. He was the 9th vice chancellor of the University of Lagos.

Education
He had his elementary education at Emmanuel Primary School, Ado-Ekiti  and St Stephen’s Primary school in Ekiti State . He attended Christ's School Ado Ekiti (1958– 1964) for  his secondary education.  He had his Bachelor of science (B.Sc) degree in Microbiology and MB;BS degree from the University of Lagos. 
He obtained his Doctorate degree (Ph.D) from  the University of Sheffield School of Medicine in 1978 and a Doctor of Medicine (MD) degree in 1982.

He is also a Fellow of the West African College of Physicians (FWACP (Lab.Med.)), Fellow National Postgraduate Medical College of Nigeria (FMCPath) and Fellow Royal College of Pathologists (FRCPath), U.K

Life and career
He started his academic career in College of Medicine, University of Lagos and rose through the ranks to be appointed Professor of Medical Microbiology and Parasitology in 1983. He was also Honorary Consultant Medical Microbiologist to the Lagos University Teaching Hospital (LUTH). At various times he was Honorary Lecturer, University of Sheffield (1976–1978), Guest Researcher, U.S Centers for Disease Control (CDC) (1982–1983) and Foundation Professor and Head of Medical Microbiology, University of Ilorin (1983–1985). He also served as the Chairman of the Nigerian Association of Colleges of Medicine (1998–2000). He also served was the President and Chairman Board of the National Postgraduate Medical College, Nigeria. and Vice-Chancellor, Ondo State University of Science and Technology (2010–2015)

Awards and honor
Nigerian National Order of Merit Award (2007)
Officer of the Order of the Niger Award (2008)
Honorary Doctor of Science Degree, University of Sheffield (2011)
Fellowship of the Nigerian Academy of Science
Fellowship of the Nigerian Academy of Medicine

References

See also
Oyewusi Ibidapo Obe
List of vice chancellors in Nigeria
University of Lagos

People from Ondo State
Vice-Chancellors of the University of Lagos
University of Lagos alumni
Academic staff of the University of Lagos
1945 births
Living people
Alumni of the University of Sheffield
Christ's School, Ado Ekiti alumni